Arthur Ashe defeated Dick Crealy in the final, 6–4, 9–7, 6–2 to win the men's singles tennis title at the 1970 Australian Open.

Rod Laver was the defending champion, but chose not to compete this year. The first round was best-of-three sets, and the rest of the tournament was best-of-five.

Seeds
All seeds receive a bye into the second round.

  Tony Roche (quarterfinals)
  John Newcombe (quarterfinals)
  Tom Okker (quarterfinals)
  Arthur Ashe (champion)
  Stan Smith (third round)
  Dennis Ralston (semifinals)
  Nikola Pilić (third round)
  Roger Taylor (semifinals)
  Robert Lutz (third round)
  Ray Ruffels (quarterfinals)
  Allan Stone (third round)
  Dick Crealy (final)
  William Bowrey (third round)
  John Alexander (third round)
  Gerald Battrick (third round)
  Bob Carmichael (second round)

Draw

Final eight

Section 1

Section 2

Section 3

Section 4

External links
 Association of Tennis Professionals (ATP) – 1970 Australian Open Men's Singles draw
 1970 Australian Open – Men's draws and results at the International Tennis Federation

Mens singles
Australian Open (tennis) by year – Men's singles